Jean Minjoz (12 October 1904 - 18 November 1987) was a French politician.

Minjoz was born in Montmélian, but moved to Besançon with his family as a child. He represented the French Section of the Workers' International (SFIO) in the Constituent Assembly elected in 1945, in the Constituent Assembly elected in 1946 and in the National Assembly from 1946 to 1958. He was the mayor of Besançon from 1945 to 1947 and from 1953 to 1977.

References

1904 births
1987 deaths
People from Savoie
Politicians from Auvergne-Rhône-Alpes
French Section of the Workers' International politicians
Socialist Party (France) politicians
Members of the Constituent Assembly of France (1945)
Members of the Constituent Assembly of France (1946)
Deputies of the 1st National Assembly of the French Fourth Republic
Deputies of the 2nd National Assembly of the French Fourth Republic
Deputies of the 3rd National Assembly of the French Fourth Republic
Mayors of places in Bourgogne-Franche-Comté
French military personnel of World War II
French Resistance members